Ecumenical News International (ENI) was a news agency that was launched in 1994 as a global news service reporting on ecumenical developments and other news of the churches, and giving religious perspectives on news developments worldwide. The agency was based at the Ecumenical Centre in Geneva, Switzerland, which is also the headquarters of several Protestant and ecumenical organizations. 
 
A shortage of funds led to the suspension of ENI's work in 2012. As of 2015 the work of ENI has remained suspended and the website has been discontinued.

External links
Ecumenical News International
Christian Post - suspension of ENI

Christian media
Christian ecumenical organizations
News agencies based in Switzerland